Asterope is a genus of brush-footed butterflies found in the Neotropical realm (South America).

Species
Listed alphabetically:
 Asterope adamsi Lathy
 Asterope batesii (Hewitson, 1850) – Bates' asterope
 Asterope buckleyi (Hewitson, 1869)
 Asterope degandii Hewitson, 1858) – Hewitson's glory
 Asterope fassli Röber
 Asterope freyja Röber
 Asterope leprieuri (Feisthamel, 1835) – Leprieur's glory
 Asterope lugens Druce
 Asterope markii (Hewitson, 1857) – dotted glory
 Asterope optima (Butler, 1869)
 Asterope salvini Staudinger
 Asterope sapphira (Hübner, [1816])
 Asterope whitelyi Salvin, 1869

References

 Jenkins, D. W. 1987 Neotropical Nymphalidae VI. Revision of Asterope (=Callithea Auct.). Bulletin of the Allyn Museum 114, 1-66

External links
TOL

Biblidinae
Nymphalidae of South America
Taxa named by Jacob Hübner
Nymphalidae genera